Sing to Me Instead is the debut studio album by Ben Platt. It was released on March 29, 2019. Two songs were released from the album on February 1, 2019: "Bad Habit" and "Ease My Mind". It is the actor's first creative project after originating the role of the titular character in the Broadway musical Dear Evan Hansen aside from appearing on one of Lin-Manuel Miranda's Hamildrops, "Found/Tonight".

Platt premiered the first single "Bad Habit" during a live performance and collaboration with Foley Gallery in early 2019. He later performed the song on The Late Show with Stephen Colbert on February 21, 2019. "Ease My Mind", "Grow as We Go" and "Temporary Love" were released as pre-release downloads on February 13, March 1, and March 8, 2019, respectively. Each song was accompanied with a music video premiere on YouTube. A deluxe edition of the album was released on May 20, 2020, in conjunction with the release of the Netflix special, Ben Platt Live from Radio City Music Hall.

Track listing
Track listing adapted from Apple Music. Credits adapted from Spotify and Tidal.

Notes
  signifies a co-producer

Personnel
Credits adapted from AllMusic.

 Jenn Decilveo – drum programming, mellotron, organ, piano, synthesizer, background vocals
 Larry Goldings – organ
 Jacob Green – electric guitar
 Alex Hope – guitars
 Sam Kauffman-Skloff – drums
 Patrick Kelly – bass
 David Levita – guitar
 Michael Pollack – piano, Juno synth
 Michael Wooten – organ
 Julia Adamy – bass 
 David Cook – piano 
 Nir Felder – guitars 
 Justin Goldner – guitars 
 Crystal Monee Hall – background vocals 
 Kojo Littles – background vocals 
 Amanda Lo – violin 
 Allen René Louis – background vocals 
 Renat Pinchas – cello 
 Mike Ricchiuti – organ 
 Derrick Wright – drums 
 Jordan Katz – trumpet
 Mike Rocha – trumpet
 Charlie Bisharat – strings
 Meredith Crawford – strings
 Ross Gasworth – strings
 Kevin Hart – string arrangements, strings
 Luanne Homzy – strings
 Benjamin Jacobson – strings
 Kevin Kumar – strings
 Jim McMillan – strings, string orchestrator
 Linnea Powell – strings
 Mary Sloan – strings

Charts

Release history

References

2019 debut albums
Atlantic Records albums
Ben Platt albums
Albums produced by Alex Hope (songwriter)
Albums produced by Eg White
LGBT-related albums
Albums produced by Jordan Riley
Albums produced by Jennifer Decilveo